Myocardin is a protein that in humans is encoded by the MYOCD gene.

Myocardin is a smooth muscle and cardiac muscle-specific transcriptional coactivator of serum response factor. When expressed ectopically in nonmuscle cells, myocardin can induce smooth muscle differentiation by its association with serum response factor (SRF; MIM 600589).[supplied by OMIM]

References

Further reading